Narendra Mohan Kasliwal (4 April 1928 – 10 January 2021) or N. M. Kasliwal was a Justice of the Supreme Court of India.

Career
Kasliwal passed B.Sc., LL.B. and enrolled as an Advocate in 1954. He practised on Civil and Constitutional matters in Rajasthan High Court. He also worked as part time lecturer in Jodhpur Law College, Jodhpur from 1960 to 1972. Kasliwal was first elevated as Additional Judge of the Rajasthan High Court on 15 June 1978. On 29 March 1989 he was transferred to the Himachal Pradesh High Court and joined as Chief Justice of this Court. He was appointed additional Judge of the Supreme Court of India on 6 October 1989. Justice Kasliwal retired in April 1993 from the judgeship. After the retirement he was appointed by the Supreme Court to oversee the election of Rajasthan Cricket Association as a principal observer in 2013.

References

1928 births
Living people
Rajasthani people
Judges of the Rajasthan High Court
Chief Justices of the Himachal Pradesh High Court
Justices of the Supreme Court of India
20th-century Indian judges
20th-century Indian lawyers
21st-century Indian lawyers
21st-century Indian judges